Japan women's national hockey team may refer to:

 Japan women's national field hockey team
 Japan women's national ice hockey team